Free Your Mind is the second album from the Indonesian pop group Maliq & D'Essentials. As opposed to the previous album, which revolved around core duo Angga and Widi Puradiredja with the support of assorted musicians, this album marked the beginning of Maliq & D'Essentials as a band in the studio. Released on 26 February 2007, it is also the last album to feature guitarist Satrio Moersid, who left in mid-November of the same year to start the band Alexa. A repackaged edition of the album, including two new songs and a reggae version of "Beri Cinta Waktu", was released in early 2008 with Moersid removed from the revised album artwork.

Track listing

Personnel
Maliq & D'Essentials
Angga Puradiredja – lead vocals, backing vocals
Indah Wisnuwardhana – lead vocals, backing vocals
Widi Puradiredja – drums, synthesizers, Moog, synth bass
Dendy "Javafinger" Sukarno – electric bass
Satrio Moersid – electric guitar, acoustic guitar
Ifa Fachir – Fender Rhodes, Hammond, Clavinet, piano
Amar Ibrahim – trumpet, flugelhorn

Additional musicians
Eki "EQ" Puradiredja – backing vocals (tracks 1, 7, 10 and 12), bass (track 8)
Maya Hasan – harp (tracks 3, 7 and 11)
Indra Lesmana – Mini Moog (track 7)
Reza Jozef "Rejoz" Patty – percussion (tracks 2 and 8)
Philippe Ciminato – percussion (tracks 4 and 10)
Renita Martadinata – backing vocals (tracks 5, 6, 8, 10 and 11)
Lawrence "Larry" Aswin – flute (tracks 5, 6 and 11)
Pradana "Kyriz" Rizky – rap (track 1)

Production
Eki "EQ" Puradiredja – producer, arranger
Widi Puradiredja – co-producer, arranger, engineer (repackaged edition tracks 1 and 2)
Angga Puradiredja – co-producer
Lawrence "Larry" Aswin – engineer (except repackaged edition tracks 1 and 2)
Indra Lesmana – mixing (tracks 2, 5, 6, 7, 8, 9, 11, 13 and 14), mastering
Simon Cotsworth – mixing (tracks 1, 3, 4, 10 and 12)

References

2007 albums
Maliq & D'Essentials albums